The Arabian Gulf Oil Company (Agoco) is an oil company based in Benghazi, Libya, engaged in crude oil and natural gas exploration, production and refining. It was a subsidiary of the state-owned National Oil Corporation (NOC).

Overview
Agoco's roots go back to 1971 when the Arabian Gulf Exploration Company (AGECO) was established, following the implementation of Law No. 115, issued by the Libyan Revolutionary Command Council nationalizing shares held by British Petroleum (BP). Agoco was formed by the NOC in late 1979 to take over the assets of a partnership of BP and Nelson Bunker Hunt of the United States, and a partnership of Chevron and Texaco called Amoseas. Agoco has upstream operations in eight oil fields, including Sarir, Messla, Nafoora, Beda and Hammada. The company also operates an oil terminal and a refinery in Tobruk and Sarir.

Agoco Fields
The Sarir field was discovered in the Sirte Basin by BP in 1961 is considered the country's largest field. The Messla field was discovered in 1971 and is situated 500 km southeast of Benghazi and is also considered one of the biggest fields in the Sirte basin. Nafoora field is situated in the northeastern part of the Sirte basin and discovered in early 1965. The Beda and Hamada fields were discovered during 1959, in the eastern Sirte basin and the southern border of the Grahames basin respectively. Bede and Hamada are nearly considered dead fields unless new Enhanced oil recovery technology can be implemented. Additionally, Agoco often operates fields owned by other companies.

Refineries and Oil Terminal
The fuel supply from the refinery meets requirements for the Sarir Agricultural Project as well as for the general area. Agoco also has a  portable petroleum refinery or topping plant at Sarir. The Tobruk refinery has been on stream since 1971 and entered the production phase during 1989. In 1990, the refinery operations were transferred to Agoco after being directly managed by the NOC. In 1996, Tobruk had two thermo-compression distillation units installed to produce 750 cm/d of drinking water from the Mediterranean Sea. The General contractor for the project was United Kingdom-based Weir Westgarth Ltd., a subsidiary of the Weir Group. 

The Marsa El Hariga Terminal (Tobruk) is situated on the southern coast of the Tobruk trading port. Construction of the terminal started in 1964, and was completed in 1966. The Marsa El Hariega oil terminal was officially inaugurated by exporting the first shipment of crude oil from Sarir in 1967. The crude from Sarir is pumped through a 400 km pipeline, with an auxiliary pumping station between Sarir and the terminal.

2011 Libyan civil war

The Arabian Gulf Oil Company announced plans to use oil funds to support anti-Gaddafi forces.

See also

List of petroleum companies

Notes

References

C.J Lewis (1990) Sarir Field: Sirte Basin, Libya
Energy Information Administration (2007) Libya: Country Analysis Brief
World Bank (2006), Libyan Arab Jamahiriya: Economic Report, Social & Economic Development Group: MENA Region
P. Mobbs (2002) Mineral Industry of Libya
P. Mobbs (2000) Mineral Industry of Libya
Thomas S. Ahlbrandt (2001) The Sirte Basin Province of Libya: Sirte-Zelten Total Petroleum System U.S. Geological Survey
BBC News

External links
 

Oil and gas companies of Libya
Cyrenaica